Walter Alison Edwards (1862 – 1924) was a U.S. educator. He served as the president of the Throop Polytechnic Institute (which later became Caltech) from 1897 to 1907.

References

1862 births
1924 deaths
Presidents of the California Institute of Technology